Host is a 2020 British computer screen supernatural horror film directed by Rob Savage. Host takes place on a screencast of a video call on Zoom, and is presented as a computer screen film. Starring Haley Bishop, Jemma Moore, Emma Louise Webb, Radina Drandova and Caroline Ward, it features a group of friends who attempt to escape a deadly supernatural force inadvertently spawned during a séance.

After a short prank skit by Savage which featured a handful of the Host cast went viral across social media, he developed the concept into a feature-length film, which was shot over 12 weeks directly on the Zoom software during the COVID-19 pandemic. The cast and crew set up their own cameras, lighting, and stunts.

An  independent film, Host was released exclusively through Shudder on July 30, 2020. It received largely positive reviews from critics, who praised its themes of social anxiety, its jump scares, and the chemistry of its acting ensemble. It has a notable  rating on review aggregator site Rotten Tomatoes, and was included on Time magazine's list of the "17 Great Movies You May Have Missed This Summer".

Plot
On July 30, 2020, while the United Kingdom is under COVID-19 pandemic lockdown, a group of friends (Haley, Jemma, Emma, Caroline, Radina & Teddy) have decided to hold weekly Zoom calls to stay in touch. For this week's call Haley has hired a medium, Seylan, to lead them in a virtual séance. Teddy is forced to leave the chat by his girlfriend, Jinny, who unintentionally disconnects him. During the séance, one of the members, Jemma, claims to feel intense tension around her neck. Overcome with fear, she says that somebody called "Jack" is with her, a friend who committed suicide in her school by hanging himself. Seylan's internet cuts out, disconnecting her from the chat. During this time, Jemma informs the group that she made "Jack" up because the silence was getting awkward, which angers Haley. The remaining members of the group begin to experience strange, terrifying phenomena: Haley's chair is pulled by an unseen force, Caroline sees a hanging corpse in her attic, and Emma's glass spontaneously breaks. Haley uses her Polaroid camera to snap a photo of her living room, where a ghostly hanging figure appears on the print.

As the girls panic, Haley manages to get back in touch with Seylan and informs her of everything that has happened; a spirit is indeed with them, but it isn't friendly. Seylan believes and explains that Jemma's prank may have allowed the spirit or demon access to our world, entering the circle during the séance. Seylan also informs the girls that the demonic spirit could be a tulpa which has taken on the guise of "Jack" in Jemma's made-up story, and begins to give them instructions on how to close the séance. The spirit interrupts this by causing more phenomena and Seylan's disconnects again before the girls attempt to close the circle using her advice. Believing the ordeal to be over, the members of the group begin to leave the Zoom call; Radina gets up and leaves the room unaware of her boyfriend Alan’s body hanging behind her. Caroline's artificial background is interrupted as her face is smashed into the camera, causing her laptop to fall. Emma's camera shows one of her filters on an invisible figure in the living room, which turns to face her. She then scatters flour on the floor, showing the footprints of the spirit coming towards her and causing her kitchen cupboards to burst open before the spirit attacks her, causing her to hide in her room.

Radina attempts to flee her home after her boyfriend Alan's body drops in front of her, but she is pulled away from the door and killed by the spirit. Caroline is killed as she pleads for help when the demon repeatedly smashes her face onto the desk. Haley and Jemma argue, blaming each other for what has occurred, when Haley is pulled off-screen and attacked. Shocked, Jemma, who lives around the corner from Haley, immediately leaves her home to try and help her. Teddy then returns to the call, as ten minutes remain until the Zoom meeting ends. Unaware of everything that has occurred, the spirit (in the form of a horrifying figure) attacks him. Chased through his house, a panicked Teddy witnesses Jinny being murdered by an unseen force before he himself is knocked down, set on fire and killed. Emma, now the only person still active in the call, fearfully turns her camera to the doorway of her room after her door suddenly opens. She throws a blanket, which lands on the invisible spirit, showing its outline. Terrified, Emma opens her window to flee but accidentally falls to her death.

Jemma arrives at Haley's home and finds, via the open Zoom call on Haley's laptop, that both Emma and Teddy are dead. The invisible spirit throws a bottle at her head while the cupboards burst open. She manages to find Haley hiding under her desk, and the pair attempt to escape the house using the flash of Haley's Polaroid camera to light the way. The invisible spirit suddenly appears in the flash of light, and it rushes at them as the Zoom call timer immediately expires.

Cast
 Haley Bishop as Haley
 Jemma Moore as Jemma
 Emma Louise Webb as Emma
 Radina Drandova as Radina
 Caroline Ward as Caroline
 Edward Linard as Teddy
 Seylan Baxter as Seylan
 Jinny Lofthouse as Jinny
 Alan Emrys as Alan
 Patrick Ward as Caroline's Dad
 James Swanton as the Spirit (Jack)

Production
The film has its basis in a short video created by Rob Savage in early 2020. The short featured Savage investigating strange sounds in his attic while on a group video chat with others. It was initially intended as a prank, as the others were unaware that a frightening visage would pop up on camera, and Savage placed the video online, where it went viral. Savage found the format easy to watch and chose to apply it to a feature-length film. He has stated that the short's success enabled him to create Host, after producers contacted him upon seeing the viral video about making a longer film.

Host was filmed while quarantine restrictions were in place due to the COVID-19 pandemic and Savage had to direct the actors remotely while they had to set up their own cameras, lighting, and stunts. According to Savage, "old school" technology was often used for special effects, with fishing wire being sent to the actors' homes "so they could practice pulling things off shelves". Practical effects were also handled by the actors and a virtual workshop was held on how to set up effects such as "moving doors, making things fly off shelves". Savage has stated that the movie took twelve weeks to complete, from conception to its delivery to Shudder.

According to Jemma Moore, the actors used a film treatment as the basis for their performances, rather than a fully worked-up script, and used improvisation and live feedback from the director during their takes: "It had all the points – they were really fleshed out and detailed – but we improvised around a lot of stuff. And Rob would be typing on Zoom while we’re in the middle of a scene, telling us what to say – it was like live scripting – or he’d private message me". In an attempt to encourage authentic responses by the cast to the film's events, prior to filming the cast participated in a séance over Zoom, and in addition the actors were only given details of their own parts, with the fates of other characters being withheld from them. Savage and Shepherd have mentioned several influences on the film, including The Blair Witch Project, Paranormal Activity, Lake Mungo and Ghostwatch, and have noted that Host contains references to a number of these.

Release
Host was released as a Shudder exclusive on July 30, 2020.

Critical response 
The site's critics' consensus states: "Lean, suspenseful, and scary, Host uses its timely premise to deliver a nastily effective treat for horror enthusiasts." On Metacritic, the film has a weighted average score of 73 out of 100, based on seven critics, indicating "generally favorable reviews".

Common praise for Host centered around its themes of social separation and anxiety. Comparisons were made between the film and the 2014 horror film Unfriended, which also featured supernatural activity occurring during a group video chat, by outlets such as the New York Times and Rue Morgue. Time magazine named it one of the "17 Great Movies You May Have Missed This Summer", saying Host is "not only one of the best horror movies of the year, but also an intimate look at creativity, film production and a shared global culture in the throes of a rampaging virus".

Referring to the film's novel portrayal of lockdown-induced paranoia, Elizabeth Horkley of The Atlantic wrote: "Host is the first great entry in the new genre of 'quarantine horror.

Accolades

References

External links
 
 

2020 horror films
2020 independent films
British independent films
British supernatural horror films
Films set in 2020
Films about social media
Found footage films
Films about the COVID-19 pandemic
Shudder (streaming service) original programming
Screenlife films
2020s English-language films
Media depictions of the COVID-19 pandemic in the United Kingdom
Demons in film